Tuomas Oskar Grönman (born 22 March 1974 ) is a Finnish former professional ice hockey player who played in the National Hockey League and SM-liiga.

Playing career
Grönman was drafted in the second round of the 1992 NHL Entry Draft by the Quebec Nordiques. After spending 4 years in Finland developing his skills Colorado Avalanche (formally the Quebec Nordiques) still owned his negotiating rights but Gronman was not offered a professional contract by the Avalanch, however soon after Quebec transferred their franchise to Colorado renaming themselves the Avalanche, Gronman's NHL negotiating rights were traded to the Chicago Blackhawks by the Colorado Avalanche on July 10th, 1996 in exchange for The Chicago Blackhawks Second Round Pick in the 1998 NHL Entry Draft, Colorado selected Phillippe Sauve with that pick. A little more than a year later on October 27th, 1997 the Chicago Blackhawks traded Gronman to the Pittsburgh Penguins in exchange for veteran forward Greg Johnson. On October 18th, 1998 while playing in a game for Pittsburgh's farm team the Kansas City Blades of the IHL, Gronman suffered a significant knee injury causing him to miss the majority of the 1998-1999 IHL season. Soon after Gronman's contract expired and with no NHL or Minor League interest - Gronman's Professional North American career was over so he took his game overseas and played for TPS, Lukko and Jokerit. Gronman would also play a role and help Finland win a bronze medal at the 1998 Winter Olympics.

Career statistics

Regular season and playoffs

International

External links 
 
 
 
 

1974 births
Living people
Chicago Blackhawks players
Finnish ice hockey defencemen
Ice hockey players at the 1998 Winter Olympics
Indianapolis Ice players
Jokerit players
Kansas City Blades players
Lukko players
Medalists at the 1998 Winter Olympics
Olympic bronze medalists for Finland
Olympic ice hockey players of Finland
Olympic medalists in ice hockey
People from Viitasaari
Pittsburgh Penguins players
Quebec Nordiques draft picks
Syracuse Crunch players
Tacoma Rockets players
HC TPS players
Sportspeople from Central Finland
20th-century Finnish people
21st-century Finnish people